Susanna (Jackson) White Winslow (-after 1654) was a passenger on the Mayflower and successively wife of fellow Mayflower passengers William White and Edward Winslow.

Born Susanna Jackson, the daughter of Richard and Mary (Pettinger) Jackson, she went to Amsterdam and joined its separatist congregation about 1608, and there she married future Mayflower passenger William White. She was mother of one son, Resolved, when she boarded the Mayflower and was pregnant during its voyage, giving birth to Peregrine in late November 1620, while the ship was anchored at Cape Cod. Peregrine was the second baby born on the Mayflowers voyage, and the first known English child born to the Pilgrims in America. Susanna was one of the four adult Pilgrim women who survived their first winter in the New World, along with Eleanor Billington, Elizabeth Hopkins, and Mary Brewster; these four, with young daughters and male and female servants, cooked the first Thanksgiving feast.

Susanna was widowed February 21, 1621, and months later remarried to Pilgrim Edward Winslow on May 12, 1621, in Plymouth Colony. Edward's prior wife had died on March 24, 1621. The wedding of Edward Winslow and Susanna was the first in Plymouth Colony.

Children of Susanna's first marriage with William White who became Edward Winslow's step-sons:
 Resolved White – born ca. 1615. Married 1640 (1) Judith Vassall, daughter of William Vassall, and had eight children. Resolved married 1674 (2) to widow Abigail Lord. She died 1682. He died 1687.
 Peregrine White – born late November 1620 on board the Mayflower in Cape Cod Harbor. Married ca. 1648/9 Sarah Bassett daughter of William Bassett, and had seven children. She died 1711. He died at Marshfield, Massachusetts, July 20, 1704.

Children of Susanna and Edward Winslow include:
 (child) born and died in 1622 or 1623
 Edward Winslow – born ca. 1624. No record after May 22, 1627.
 John Winslow – born ca. 1626. No record after May 22, 1627.
 Josiah Winslow, 13th Governor of Plymouth Colony – born ca. 1627. Married Penelope Pelham by 1658 and had four children. He died 1680. She died 1703.
 Elizabeth Winslow – born ca. 1631. Married (1) Robert Brooks on 8 April 1656 in Clapham, Surrey, and had one son. Married (2) George Curwin 1669 and had two daughters. He died 1684/5. She died 1698.

Susanna died between December 18, 1654 (Edward Winslow's will) and July 2, 1675 (date of son Josiah's will). She was buried in Winslow Cemetery.  As well, Winslow Cemetery has a substantial stone monument to "The Early Settlers of Green Harbor Marshfield" naming, among others, Susanna, Resolved and Peregrine White, and Susanna's second husband Edward Winslow.

References

Mayflower passengers
People from Plymouth, Massachusetts
17th-century women
Year of death missing
Burials at Winslow Cemetery
Year of birth uncertain
1592 births